The Nintendo Switch Pro Controller is a game controller developed and manufactured by Nintendo for use with the Nintendo Switch video game console. It is an alternative controller to the Joy-Con.

Design and features
The Nintendo Switch Pro Controller incorporates a button layout similar to that of the Wii's Classic Controller Pro, but utilizes a staggered analog stick layout employed by the GameCube controller and Microsoft's family of Xbox consoles, with its overall design being highly similar to that of the Xbox Wireless Controller. Up to eight Pro Controllers can be synced to the Nintendo Switch. Additionally, the Pro Controller can also be paired with or connected to a PC for use with PC games, such as those on Steam which added support for the Pro Controller through a beta client update on May 9, 2018. The Pro Controller also supports near-field communication for use with Nintendo's Amiibo line as well as HD Rumble and motion controls. The controller takes approximately 6 hours to fully charge, and is user-replaceable with the same battery (CTR-003) as the 3DS/2DS and Wii U Pro Controller. When fully charged, the battery duration for the Nintendo Switch Pro Controller can last approximately 40 hours. The controller also features a USB-C connector, as well as coming with a USB-C to Type-A charging cord, which can be connected to the USB-A 2.0 ports on the Switch dock. Official Nintendo Switch Pro Controller support was added to iPhones and iPads as part of its iOS 16 update.

History
The Nintendo Switch Pro Controller was unveiled along with the Nintendo Switch on October 20, 2016, and was released on March 3, 2017.

Special editions 
The Nintendo Switch Pro Controller is available in black, and also in the following special editions:

Splatoon 2 edition: green handle (left), pink handle (right) with an ink splat design
Xenoblade Chronicles 2 edition: pink handles with a Pyra-inspired design
Super Smash Bros. Ultimate edition: white handles with a white Super Smash Bros. logo design
Monster Hunter Rise edition: black with a gold Magnamalo design
Monster Hunter Rise: Sunbreak edition: black with a silver Malzeno design
Splatoon 3 edition: blue handle (left), neon yellow handle (right) with an ink splat design

A special Splatoon 2 edition Pro Controller with golden handles was awarded to the winning team of the PAX East 2019 Inkling Open.

A special Pro Controller imprinted with the Super Smash Bros. logo was awarded to the winners of the Super Smash Bros. tournament at PAX East 2019, as well as to Shuto Moriya, the winner of the Super Smash Bros. Ultimate tournament at EVO Japan 2020.

Reception 
TechRadar praised the controller's handling, build quality and battery life, but criticized its shoulder buttons for being too shallow and high price. Overall, it's a "must-have if you primarily use your Nintendo Switch at home".

Secret message 
On the controller's motherboard, if a player holds down on the right stick and looks closely into the transparent plastic surrounding its socket while shining a light on it, there is a hidden message that reads "THX2ALLGAMEFANS!". The message was discovered by Japanese Twitter user Geo Stream on March 4, 2017, one day after the Switch's launch.

See also 
Wii U Pro Controller
Classic Controller

References

Nintendo controllers
Nintendo Switch accessories